This is a list of confirmed and prospective destinations that Air Astana is flying to:

Destinations

References

Air Astana